Lugo di Vicenza is a town and comune in the province of Vicenza, Veneto, Italy. It is east of SP349 provincial road.

Main sights
Villa Godi, designed by Andrea Palladio, in the locality of Lonedo  
 Villa Piovene, another Palladian villa

Twin towns
Lugo di Vicenza is twinned with:

  Ostra Vetere, Italy
  Cerchiara di Calabria, Italy
  Uggiano la Chiesa, Italy
  Fossacesia, Italy

References

External links
(Google Maps)

Cities and towns in Veneto